Beryllophantis microtera is a species of moth of the family Tortricidae. It is found in Papua New Guinea. The habitat consists of montane rain forests with Nothofagus.

The wingspan is 12.5 mm for males and 14.5 mm for females. The costal half of the wing has a green ground colour, while the dorsal half is creamy, dusted with ferrugineous. The dividing line is sinuate. The hindwings are pale grey-brown, indistinctly marbled with darker.

References

Moths described in 1979
Tortricini
Moths of Papua New Guinea
Taxa named by Marianne Horak